Bossman or Boss Man may refer to:

Music
"Bossman" (song), by Beenie Man
"Bossman", a song by Nancy Sinatra from Nancy Sinatra 
"Bossman", a song by rapper Soulja Slim from The Streets Made Me
Boss Man (album), a 2020 album by American rapper Rich the Kid

People
 Bossman (rapper),  Travis Holifield or Jimmy Hash, American hip hop artist
 Ray Traylor (1963–2004), American professional wrestler
 Bossman, a fictional member of the Amoeba Boys, a group of characters in the animated series The Powerpuff Girls

People with the surname
 Francis Bossman (born 1984), Ghanaian footballer
 Kelvin Bossman (born 1991), Ghanaian footballer
 Peter Bossman (born 1955), Ghanaian-Slovenian doctor and politician

See also
Big Boss Man (disambiguation)